The 1998–99 Elitserien season was the 24th season of the Elitserien, the top level of ice hockey in Sweden. 12 teams participated in the league, and Brynäs IF won the championship.

Standings

Playoffs

External links
 Swedish Hockey League official site

Swe
1998–99 in Swedish ice hockey
Swedish Hockey League seasons